Sentinel Peak is a 4,355-foot (1,327-meter) mountain summit located at the head of Glacier Bay's Queen Inlet in Glacier Bay National Park and Preserve, in the Alsek Ranges of the Saint Elias Mountains, in southeast Alaska. Although modest in elevation, relief is significant since the mountain rises up from tidewater in less than two miles. The mountain was named in 1892 by Harry Fielding Reid, an American geophysicist, who studied glaciology in Glacier Bay. He so named it because Carroll Glacier is guarded by Sentinel Peak, and a sentinel is a guard whose job is to stand and keep watch. Weather permitting, Sentinel Peak can be seen from Glacier Bay, which is a popular destination for cruise ships. The months May through June offer the most favorable weather for viewing or climbing the peak.

Climate

Based on the Köppen climate classification, Sentinel Peak has a subarctic climate with cold, snowy winters, and mild summers. Temperatures can drop below −20 °C with wind chill factors below −30 °C. Precipitation runoff from the mountain drains into Glacier Bay Basin.

See also
List of mountain peaks of Alaska
Geography of Alaska

References

External links
 Weather forecast: Sentinel Peak
 Sentinel Peak snow-covered: Flickr photo

Mountains of Glacier Bay National Park and Preserve
Saint Elias Mountains
Landforms of Hoonah–Angoon Census Area, Alaska
Mountains of Alaska
North American 1000 m summits